Denn is a civil parish in County Cavan in the Republic of Ireland with three churches.

Ethnology 
The name "Denn" is derived from the old Irish word "dionga", meaning "fortress". The townlands of Denbann and Denmore roughly translate to the "white fort" and the "large fort" respectively.

Location 
Denn is located between the towns of Cavan and Ballyjamesduff in County Cavan, Ireland. It is part of the baronies of Castlerahan, Clanmahon and Loughtee Upper. The parish is located nearby to the small mountain Slieve Glah. The villiage of Crosskeys is located in the center of the parish.

Amenities 
Denn has one Anglican (Denmore church) and two Catholic churches (St. Matthew's in Crosskeys and Drumavaddy in Carrickaboy), A Gaelic football club (Denn GFC) a national school (Crosskeys National School), a resource center, a community center and an inn.

Townlands 
There are 58 townlands in Denn parish:

 Acres
 Aghadoon or Ravenfield
 Aghadreenagh
 Aghalattafraal
 Aghateggal/Ryefort
 Aghavaddy
 Aghnahaia Glebe
 Ardkill Beg
 Ardkill More
 Ardlougher
 Ardvarny
 Banagher
 Blackbull
 Carn
 Carrickaboy Glebe
 Carrickatober
 Corglass
 Cornagrow
 Cornamahan
 Cornaseer
 Corrakane
 Corraweelis
 Crumlin
 Denn Glebe
 Dennbane
 Dennmore/Leggandenn
 Derrylurgan
 Drumavaddy
 Drumbarry
 Drumcanon
 Drumcrow
 Drumhirk
 Drumliff
 Farragh
 Gallon Glebe
 Gallonbulloge/Blackbull
 Killycannan
 Killynanum
 Killyteane
 Killyvally
 Kilnacor
 Kilnacreevy
 Lackanclare
 Lackanduff
 Lackanmore
 Largan
 Leggandenn
 Lishenry
 Lislea
 Lismeen
 Lonnogs
 Moher
 Newtown
 Pollafree
 Pollakeel
 Pottle
 Pottlesoden
 Ranrenagh
 Ravenfield 
 Ryefort 
 Shannow
 Tullytreane

Notes

External links
Flickr

Civil parishes of County Cavan